The Flat Iron Building in Chicago Heights, Illinois, was listed on the National Register of Historic Places in 2003. It was torn down in 2009.

References

Buildings and structures on the National Register of Historic Places in Cook County, Illinois
Commercial buildings on the National Register of Historic Places in Illinois
Demolished buildings and structures in Illinois
Commercial buildings completed in 1925
Buildings and structures demolished in 2009